The ESP Viper is an electric guitar manufactured by ESP Guitars. The ESP Viper has a shape similar to that of a Gibson SG, with slight variations; Vipers have a slight diagonal slope at the bottom and an asymmetrical front profile. The body is mahogany or alder. The neck is three pieces, with a rosewood fingerboard. As standard, it comes fitted with an EMG 81/85 pickup set. It has a scale length of 24.75".

The LTD Vipers that are made by ESP's sister line are lower cost and of different quality to the ESP Viper. LTD Vipers are made of less expensive materials and do not possess the same specifications as ESP Vipers (with the exception of the higher-end LTDs, having EMG 81/85 pickups like the ESP Viper). Unlike the ESP Viper line, the LTD line features a Viper with Seymour Duncan passive pickups.

Standard features
The ESP Viper has a set-through neck, 24.75" scale, a mahogany body and neck, ebony fingerboard, 42mm bone nut, thin U-neck contour, 24 XJ frets, black nickel Hardware, 
Gotoh Magnum Lock tuners, Gotoh TOM bridge and tailpiece, 
EMG 81 (B) / 85 (N) active p.u., and BLKS finish.

The Viper-7 has set-neck construction, 25.5" scale, 45mm bone nut, EMG 707 (B & N) Active p.u.

Artists or bands who have used ESP Vipers 

Bruce Kulick of Billy Squier, Blackjack, Kiss, Union, Eric Singer Project, Daniel MCCartney, Grand Funk Railroad, Meat Loaf, and MEIK (Note: Bruce has his own signature ESP Viper)
Ossan Deneç of Murder King
James Hetfield of Metallica
Pepper Keenan of Down and Corrosion of Conformity
Kirk Windstein of Down and Crowbar
Woody Weatherman of Corrosion of Conformity
Jules Hodgson of KMFDM
Captain Sensible of The Damned
Tony Perry of Pierce The Veil
Max Cavalera of Soulfly and Cavalera Conspiracy; formerly of Sepultura
Fallon Bowman of Amphibious Assault and Kittie
Sonny Moore of From First to Last
Thomas Erak of The Fall of Troy
Damon Johnson of Alice Cooper
Travis Miguel of Atreyu
Chino Moreno of the Deftones
Ahrue Luster of Ill Niño and formerly Machine Head
Zoltán Farkas of Ektomorf
Franko Beaulieu of Neon Rise
Kaoru of Dir En Grey (Note: Actually uses ESP DKV, his new custom guitar series)
Matt DeVries of Chimaira
Rob Arnold of Chimaira
Myk Russell of LoveHateHero
Timoteo Rosales III of I Am Ghost
Tim Millar of Protest the Hero
Nikolay Kiselev of Bratsk-city
Manabu of Screw
Members of Whitechapel 
Vorph of Samael
Louise Post of Veruca Salt
Phil X of The Drills and Powder¨
Lindsay Mcdougall of Frenzal Rhomb
Joshua Moore of We Came As Romans
Sebastian Oliver Lange of In Extremo
Ryan Reed of Rite To Remain
Joe Weber of Skysplitter
Reba Meyers of Code Orange
Tony Reed of Mos Generator 
Lars Frederiksen of Rancid
Viper